Styposis colorados is a species of comb-footed spider in the family Theridiidae. It is found in Ecuador.

References

Theridiidae
Spiders described in 1964
Spiders of South America